White Plains TransCenter is an intermodal transit center in White Plains, New York. It serves as a terminal/transfer point for many Bee-Line Buses, as well as intercity buses, and taxicabs. The terminal is located along Ferris Avenue north of Hamilton Street (westbound NY 119), diagonally across from the White Plains station of Metro-North Railroad, and includes a parking garage located next door to the railroad station, across that street. Ferris Avenue is a one-way street north of Main Street (eastbound NY 119), and is flanked by northbound and southbound buses only lanes between Hamilton Street and Water Street.

The main building of the TransCenter can be found on the block along Ferris Avenue to the west, Water Street to the south, Lexington Avenue to the west, and New Street to the north, which is also covered by the building itself. The parking garage across the street also contains bicycle racks on the northwest corner of Ferris Avenue and New Street, which is also the entrance to the station parking lot north of NY 119.

History

The White Plains Railroad Station has been a major transportation hub from its days as a New York Central and Hudson River Railroad station, with trolley routes such as the New York, Elmsford and White Plains Railroad and the Tarrytown, White Plains and Mamaroneck Railway Company, both of which were acquired by the Westchester Street Railroad Company, an affiliate of the Third Avenue Railway. Throughout the 20th century, trolleys were replaced by buses, many of which were private and localized companies, that were eventually acquired by Bee-LineBus  beginning in 1978. It also attracted intercity buses, such as Greyhound, Trailways, Short Line, and other companies. The station was merged with Pennsylvania Railroad transforming it into a Penn Central Railroad station. Buses and trains continued to use the station through the collapse of Penn Central, the acquisition by Conrail and the MTA, the full control by Metro-North Railroad, and the reconstruction of the station during the mid-1980s. The current TransCenter was built shortly after the reconstruction of the aforementioned railroad station.

Bus list

The following bus routes serve the White Plains TransCenter area, in the vicinity of the station.

References

External links

City of White Plains - White Plains TransCenter

Transit centers in the United States
Bus stations in New York (state)
Buildings and structures in White Plains, New York
Transportation buildings and structures in Westchester County, New York